Larry Fallon (born Lawrence James Freaso; September 8, 1936 – June 2, 2005) was an American composer, arranger and record producer.

Career
Fallon's arranger credits include Van Morrison's Astral Weeks, Nico's Chelsea Girl, Jimmy Cliff's Wonderful World, Beautiful People, the Rolling Stones' "Gimme Shelter" and Gil Scott-Heron's Bridges. He played the distinctive harpsichord arrangement on Morrison's "Cyprus Avenue". He also arranged horns and strings on the Looking Glass's first album, Looking Glass.  He co-wrote Traffic's "Shanghai Noodle Factory."

Fallon died in Hoboken, New Jersey, at the age of 68.

References

External links

1936 births
2005 deaths
American music arrangers
American male composers
American record producers
American male conductors (music)
American keyboardists
20th-century American composers
20th-century American conductors (music)
20th-century American male musicians